Phantom Crash is a vehicular combat video game developed by Genki and published by Phantagram exclusively for Xbox. It allowed for large amounts of customization for the weapons, from the AI controlling the mech all the way down to the paint job. A sequel was released exclusively for PlayStation 2 called S.L.A.I.: Steel Lancer Arena International.

Plot
The game takes place in a cyberpunk setting in the year 2031. Old Tokyo is a deserted ruin, but a haven for Rumbling, a new form of televised combat sport involving mecha known in the game as SVs. The SVs are capable of wielding different weapons and abilities such as temporary invisibility thanks to AI installed in each SV. Players assume the role of a recent, nameless arrival intent on climbing the ranks of this sport who meets many characters involved in the sport along the way; each character has different sub-plots and problems that contribute to the setting providing an interesting distraction. Although unknown to the rest of the cast, the First Ranker of the sport along with her AI companion seem to notice something about the main character.

Reception

Phantom Crash received "mixed or average" reviews, according to review aggregator Metacritic.

References

External links

2002 video games
Genki (company) games
Multiplayer and single-player video games
Phantagram games
Vehicular combat games
Video games about mecha
Video games developed in Japan
Xbox games
Xbox-only games